The Royal School is a mixed boarding school located in Dungannon, County Tyrone, Northern Ireland. It was one of a number of 'free schools' created by James I (otherwise known as James VI of Scotland) in 1608 to provide an education to the sons of local merchants and farmers during the plantation of Ulster. Originally set up in Mountjoy near Lough Neagh in 1614, it moved to its present location in 1636. It was founded as a boys school but became coed in 1986 when the school amalgamated with the Dungannon High School for Girls.
It has four 'sister' schools, The Royal School, Armagh in Armagh, County Armagh, The Enniskillen Royal Grammar School in Enniskillen, County Fermanagh, The Royal School Cavan in County Cavan, and the Royal and Prior School in Raphoe, County Donegal. The original intention had been to have a "Royal School" in each of Ireland's counties (James I Order in Council read, "that there shall be one Free School at least appointed in every County, for the education of youth in learning and religion." ) but only five were actually established, the schools planned for other counties never coming into being.

History
The Royal School, Dungannon is one of several Royal Schools ordered in 1608 by James I with the intended purpose "that there shall be one Free School at least appointed in every County, for the education of youth in learning and religion." These schools provided an English style education to the sons of landed settlers in Ireland, most of whom were of Scottish or English descent. A royal charter of 13 May 1614 records the appointment of John Bullingbroke as the first headmaster. Three more headmasters were appointed by royal charters before the Archbishop of Armagh (Church of Ireland) took over the selection of headmasters from the Crown in 1682. A later Archbishop lost interest in the school and the management was taken over by the Presbyterian Congregation in Dungannon. This was quite a turn round as in earlier years Presbyterians were not allowed to attend except on condition that they converted to Anglicanism. In the literature of the nineteenth century the Royal School Dungannon is sometimes referred to as "Dungannon College" and in the writing of the eighteenth century it is referred to as "the Dungannon school". 

Paul Hewitt was the twentieth headmaster and oversaw the major change to co-education in 1986, the expansion and rebuilding of the campus, the development of close links with Dilworth School, New Zealand, in an exchange scheme for GAP pupils, and the growth of the school to over 650 pupils including a boarding department of 46 pupils and 6 full-time staff. Hewitt was chairman of the 1608 Royal Schools of Ulster when they celebrated their quatercentenary of the original charter in 2008 and were visited by Queen Elizabeth II and Prince Philip, Duke of Edinburgh, and the president of the Republic of Ireland, Mary McAleese. He was the fifth longest serving headmaster of RSD when he retired after 25 years' service in 2009 and was succeeded by David Burnett, previously deputy head of a boys' grammar school in Essex. The school has consistently figured in the top 10 grammar schools in Northern Ireland and the top 150 schools in the UK at Advanced Level.

On 11 March 2015 Prince Richard, Duke of Gloucester, visited the school to join in its 400-year celebrations. He unveiled a plaque, and signed the visitor book along with raising a new school flag.

Royal School for Girls
The Royal School for Girls was founded in 1889 and was known as the "Girls' Department" (until at least 1908) housed in the Robinson (North) wing of the Royal School between 1892 and 1926. This school became Dungannon High School for Girls in a self-contained campus adjoining Royal School lands on Ranfurly Road. In 1986 the high school was re-merged with the Royal School. The last headmistress of the high School was Margaret E Macbeth who became a vice principal in the amalgamated school. Macbeth retired in 1994.

The Royal and High School sites were joined with a covered walkway at the time of amalgamation and the high school building remained in use until 2003. Following the building of new classrooms that were sited closer to the original boys' school, the majority of the high school was demolished and redeveloped as sporting facilities.

Dilworth Scholarship
James Dilworth, a former pupil of the school, left money in his will to found Dilworth School, Auckland, New Zealand in 1906. Since the 1990s links between the two schools have been cemented, with annual exchanges of students. Four upper-sixth-formers from the Royal School, two boys and two girls, currently spend a gap year as staff members of Dilworth School before starting university. In return, three boys leaving Dilworth join RSD staff as GAP tutors. On 7 October 2014 the Ulster History Circle unveiled a blue plaque in his memory on the main building, the "Old Grey Mother"; the joint unveilers were the headmasters of the Royal School and the Dilworth School. 30 pupils from Dilworth attended.

Motto and colours
The Royal School Dungannon's motto is 'Perseverando', Latin for 'by persevering'. It is sometimes interpreted as 'never say die' however their strapline, 'Excellence Through Perseverance', reflects the original translation more closely.
The school motto was only introduced in 1986, when the Royal School Dungannon merged with the Girls' High School, adopting their motto as its own. Previous to this RSD did not have any form of motto.

The school colours, chocolate and magenta, were adopted in 1870. They are shared by two other UK schools: Fettes College in Edinburgh and the rugby colours of Bradford Grammar School.

Sports
Having sporting facilities such as three rugby pitches, two hockey pitches (one a new-generation, floodlit astroturf pitch) indoor and outdoor cricket facilities, a sports hall with treadmills and other equipment for personal and team training, the school sports are rugby and hockey in winter, and athletics and cricket are played competitively along with shooting. Tennis, swimming, table-tennis, golf, horse riding, cross-county, and netball are also available throughout the year. Many of the facilities are shared by the wider community such as primary schools, youth organisations, soccer, hockey and gaelic clubs.

The Old Grey Mother
'The Old Grey Mother' is an affectionate name for the school, referring to the older part of the current building, which is both old (1789) and grey, as the original sandstone was first cement rendered to prevent water ingress which then became stained over the 19th century by the local industrial chimneys' smoke emissions. The Former Pupils' Association occasionally use this name in correspondence to members. The term "Old Grey Mother" was first used when the original sandstone front of the headmaster's house was covered with a cement rendering which discoloured badly (due to industrial chimney discharges) until cleaned in the 1980s.

Houses
A house system exists to facilitate healthy sporting and academic competition. All students are assigned a house upon enrolling – where possible this is the same house as assigned to a previous relative at the school.

The current houses are named below. The names in brackets indicate the full name of each house given when the amalgamation with Dungannon High School for Girls in 1986 incorporated the high school's own house system. 1986 names follow the original, historic Royal School names. 
 Mountjoy (now, Mountjoy-Ranfurly);
 Bullingbrook (now, Bullingbrook-Tyrone);
 Beresford (now, Beresford-Charlemount);
 Nicholson (now, Nicholson-Dungannon).

The names of houses refer to notable past headmasters, alumni or local geography.

Notable alumni and staff

Charles Dent Bell, (1818–1898), Anglican cleric and author.
Thomas Bloomer, (1894–1984), Anglican cleric and Bishop of Carlisle.
Sir Robert Edward Bredon, (1846–1918), deputy inspector of the Chinese Imperial Customs Service.
Francis Brinkley,(1841–1912), newspaper proprietor and scholar of Japanese culture.
Darren Clarke, (born 1968), professional golfer, winner of the 2011 Open.
Richard Collins, Baron Collins, (1842–1911), Privy Councillor, Master of the Rolls and judge at Oscar Wilde's libel action against the Marquis of Queensberry in 1895.  
Joseph Stirling Coyne (1803–1868), playwright, author and dramatist.
William Craig, (1924–2011), loyalist politician, MP for East Belfast.
John Creighton, (1648-unknown), soldier of fortune who served the Crown principally in Scotland and fought the Covenanters. His biography was ghost written by Jonathan Swift.
Sir William Crossley, 1st Baronet, (1844–1911), engineer, co-founder of Crossley Bros engine makers, MP.
John Richard Darley, (1799–1884), headmaster of the Royal School, Bishop of the United Diocese of Kilmore, Elphin and Ardagh.
Sir Frederick Matthew Darley, (1830–1910), Chief Justice and Lieutenant Governor of New South Wales and Member of the Privy Council.
Abraham Dawson (Dean of Dromore), (1826–1905), Anglican cleric, author and Archdeacon of Dromore.
William Dawson, (1831–1911), Royal Navy, Editorial Secretary Missions to Seamen, author and correspondent.
William Richard Dawson, (1864–1950), chief medical officer Northern Ireland, lieutenant colonel RAMC, medical author.
Thomas Dickson, (1861-unknown), businessman, sportsman and amateur golfer, winner of the first Amateur Close Championship (Golf) at Portrush 1893.
James Dilworth, (1815–1894), philanthropist and founder of Dilworth School, Auckland, New Zealand.
Richard Dowse, (1824–1890), judge and politician.
George Kelly Dunlop, (1830–1888). Anglican clergyman and Bishop in St. Paul's Church, Las Vegas, Nevada, USA.
Andrew Robert Fausset, (1821–1910), Canon of York, Church of England clergyman and author.
William Neilson Hancock, (1820–1888), lawyer and economist.
Lady Sylvia Hermon, (born 1955), MP politician, ex Dungannon High School.
George Higinbotham, (1826–1892), Chief Justice of Victoria, Australia
Waller Hobson (1851–1924), Anglican clergyman and Archdeacon of Armagh.
Hugh Holmes, (1840–1916), barrister, MP and judge of the Court of Appeal in Ireland.
Paddy Johns, (born 1968), Irish Rugby Football Union.
Joseph Johnston, (1890–1972), academic, writer and member of Seanad Éireann.
William King (bishop) (1650–1729), Archbishop of Dublin and theologian who delivered the sermon in Dublin to celebrate the victory of William of Orange at the battle of the Boyne.
Robert Foster Kennedy (1884–1952), neurologist.
Francis Fowke (1823–1865), soldier, engineer and designer of the Royal Albert Hall, London.
Hugh Law, (1818–1883), Lord Chancellor of Ireland
Robert William Lowry, (1824–1905), soldier with service in Crimea and Canada commanding a force to suppress the Fenian raid on Fort Eric in 1866.

Dominick McCausland, (1806–1873), judge and religious writer.
James Carlile McCoan (1829–1904), politician, MP, author and journalist.
Kenneth Maginnis, (born 1938), politician and MP for Fermanagh and South Tyrone.
W.F. Marshall (1888–1959), Presbyterian clergyman, poet, author, wrote the school song.
Lindsay Mason, (1945–2006), loyalist politician.
Kris Meeke, (born 1979), rally driver, IRC World Champion 2009.
William Flavelle Monypenny, (1866–1912), journalist and biographer.
Dr Joseph Agnew Moon, (1864–1947), fleet surgeon Royal Navy, survived the sinking of HMS Victoria in 1893.
Peter Nelson, (born 1992), Irish rugby player selected to play in Canada World Cup.
John Nicholson, (1821–1857), Imperial hero, fatally wounded during the storming of Delhi, 1857.
 Sir William Olpherts (1822–1902): officer in the Indian Army, awarded the Victoria Cross for service at Lucknow in 1857.
Mortimer O'Sullivan (1782 or 83–1859), not a pupil at RSD but headmaster of RSD, Church of Ireland clergyman and author.
 Thomas Orr, (1857–1937), Minister of Finance, Union of South Africa. 
David Pollock, (born 1987), Ulster rugby player.
Nicholas McKelvey, (born 1991), Irish Alpine Ski team, selected to represent Ireland at the 2011 World Alpine Ski Championships in Garmisch-Partenkirchen, Germany, 2011 World Universiade Winter Games in Erzurum, Turkey & 2007 European Youth Olympic Festival in Jaca, Spain. 
Alexander George Richey (1830–1883), historian.
Joanne Salley, (born 1977), artist and television presenter.
Victor Sloan, (born 1945), artist.
Robertson Smyth, (1879–1916), major RAMC, international rugby player for Ireland, British Isles and the Barbarians.
Frederick Thomas Trouton, (1863–1922), experimental physicist.
James Swanton Waugh, (1822–1898), Wesleyan clergyman in 19th century Australia.
Sir Francis Verner Wylie, (1891–1970), Indian civil servant.
Gerald Francis Yeo, (1845–1909), physiologist.

References

External links
The Royal School, Dungannon official website

1614 establishments in Ireland
Educational institutions established in the 1610s
Private schools in Northern Ireland
Grammar schools in County Tyrone
Dungannon
Boarding schools in Northern Ireland
Boarding schools in Ireland
Schools with a royal charter